Dame Susan Dilys Dougan  ( Ryan; born 3 March 1955) is the Governor-General of Saint Vincent and the Grenadines since 1 August 2019. She is the first woman to hold the office.

She was appointed Dame Grand Cross of the Order of St Michael and St George on 29 January 2020  and was appointed an Officer of the Order of the British Empire in the Queen's 2010 Birthday Honour List for services to education and
to public administration.

Early life and education 
Susan Dilys Dougan was born in the village of Colonarie in Saint Vincent. She holds a MA (ED) in Curriculum and Evaluation from the University of Southampton, Hampshire, England.

Career 
Dame Susan Dougan began her career as a non-graduate teacher. Over a 34-year career, Dame Susan rose through the ranks of the teaching service to Headmistress of the St. Vincent Girls High School (2001-2004), and later served as Chief Education Officer from 2004 to 2009. She also served as Cabinet Secretary from October 2009 to September 2013.

Dame Susan has also served in several other national capacities such as Representative to the Organization of American States for St. Vincent and the Grenadines, Representative to the Commonwealth of Learning for St. Vincent and the Grenadines, and Chief Shelter Manager for St. Vincent and the Grenadines.

She was appointed as the Governor-General's Deputy in December 2014. Dame Susan was sworn in as the first female Governor-General of St. Vincent and the Grenadines on 1 August 2019.  She was administered the oaths of Office and Allegiance by High Court Justice Brian Cottle during a ceremony witnessed by state officials as well as relatives, friends, and the media.

References 

Living people
1955 births
Governors-General of Saint Vincent and the Grenadines
Officers of the Order of the British Empire
Dames Grand Cross of the Order of St Michael and St George
Saint Vincent and the Grenadines women in politics